McMullen's, known locally as Mac's, is a regional brewery founded in 1827 in Hertford, England.  The brewery expanded during the second half of the 19th century by purchasing other breweries and their associated pubs.  In 1902 it was the second largest brewery in Hertfordshire. The brewery has occupied several different sites in Hertford and moved to its current location in 1891. There have been several breweries on this site and the current one opened in 2006.  As of 2021, members of the 6th generation of the McMullen family are still involved with the business.

History

McMullen's was founded in 1827 in Back Street (now Railway Street) Hertford by Peter McMullen(1798-1881), the son of an Irish nurseryman. 
The passing of the Beerhouse Act in 1830 enabled Peter McMullen to open his own beerhouse named after William IV in Mill Bridge, Hertford. The passing of the Beerhouse Act acted as a stimulus to common brewing and led to an increase in the number of breweries in Hertford, peaking at eight in Hertford in 1838. In 1966 McMullen's were the sole survivor. In 1860 Peter McMullen passed the business onto his sons Alexander Henry and Osmond Henry who began trading as P. McMullen & Sons. The company expanded during this period and acquired a number of local breweries. As the business grew it moved to Old Cross, Hertford in 1891 and a new brewery was built.  The new brewery was designed by William Bradford and is now a grade II listed building.  In 1897 the brewery became a limited company, McMullen & Sons Ltd, when it owned 90 pubs. Osmond Henry became Chairman of the new company whilst Alexander Henry retired from the brewery and founded a seed merchant in Hertford.

By 1902 McMullen's were the second largest brewery in Hertfordshire, behind Benskins Brewery of Watford and owned 131 pubs Osmond Henry died in May 1914 and his son Lieutenant colonel Osmond Robert became chairman. Osmond Henrys's grandson Peter, a former Special Operations Executive colonel, ran the brewery from 1946 to 1980. In 1966 the brewery owned 200 pubs. A modern brewhouse was built in 1984 when John McMullen was company director.

From the 1960s until the early 1990s, Mac's also brewed a range of kids' soft drinks that were sold at their pubs and also in the local ice cream stands and newsagent shops. These included lemonade, Shandimac, ginger beer, lime soda, orange soda, and Maxi-Cola which came in reuseable glass bottles that could be returned for a discount on the next drink.

In 2002 there was a split between various members of the McMullen family some of whom wanted to turn their holdings into cash whilst others were happy to remain shareholders. Financial consultants were appointed and the company was put up for sale. The company was independently valued at £176m in 2002. A new independent chairman, Charles Brims, secured a compromise whereby several non-brewing property investments were sold in order to release cash to appease the majority shareholders and a plan was developed to build a new, smaller brewhouse. The company decided to shed contract brewing and take advantage of tax breaks by becoming a smaller brewer. As the new Whole Hop Brewery (opened 2006) was more compact than the 1984-built plant, the spare land was sold to Sainsbury's in 2007. This is the fifth McMullen brewery to operate on this site

McMullen's brews cask ale and pasteurised bottled beers. The company owns over 130 freehold pubs, mainly in the Home Counties, with a number in London, including The Spice of Life in Cambridge Circus, The White Swan in Pimlico and The Nag's Head in Covent Garden. McMullen's is acquisitive and has recently purchased pubs and bars in Cambridge, Chelmsford, Sevenoaks, Fleet, Marlow, Milton Keynes and Bishop's Stortford.

Due to the forced pub closures during the COVID-19 pandemic of 2020–21, Mac's began selling takeaway casks of beer directly from their brewery yard.  The company has no debt.

Beers
McMullen's produces three regular cask ales and several occasional ales.  The regular range consists of:

Cask Ales

Cask ales are real ales that have been cask conditioned and will continue to ferment in the cask in a process known as secondary fermentation.

McMullen AK
McMullen AK is a mild beer with an ABV of 3.7%, brewed in Hertford since 1833. AK was once a popular designation for beers which were light in gravity and colour and lightly hopped. Brewed with a mix of malts with Kentish Witbread Goldings the only hops used.

McMullen IPA
McMullen IPA is a traditional English IPA with an ABV of 4.8%. The Hops used are undisclosed, but are added as whole leaf hops, as opposed to the compressed hops pellets more commonly used in non-traditional brewing.

Country Best Bitter
Country Best Bitter, first brewed in 1964, is a traditional bitter with an ABV of 4.3%, brewed with Fuggle, Progress and Bramling Cross hops and a mixture of pale malts.

McMullen Cask
McMullen house cask ale, in production since 2007, is a 3.8%ABV 'honey-gold' ale with undisclosed ingredients

Mac's No.1 Pale Ale
Number One Pale Ale is a 3.8% amber cask ale popular among agricultural workers since the turn of the century. It was previously advertised under the slogan "second to no-one", or "second to none", and was known as No. 1 Bitter before 1950. Discontinued during the early 1990s, but brought back into production in 2021.

Bootwarmer
Bootwarmer is an old ale first brewed in 1995 and sold in McMullen pubs during the Christmas holidays from 2002 onwards. It was discontinued in 2019 due to the COVID-19 pandemic, but brought back in December 2021.

Bottled Beers

McMullen Hertford Castle
Hertford Castle is a 5%ABV strong ale brewed with Suffolk barley and undeclared whole leaf hops. First brewed in 1960, the beer is named after Hertford Castle, where Queen Elizabeth I of England spent much of her childhood.

McMullen Stronghart
A speciality brew with an ABV of 7%, Stronghart is made to an 1850s recipe with East Anglian barley and undeclared whole leaf hops and won gold in the 1997 CAMRA Champion Beer of Briton barley wine and strong old ale class. Originally known as Mac's Olde Time Strong Ale, it was rebranded as Stronghart in 1993.

Rivertown
The Rivertown range was introduced in 2017 to produce vegan friendly pale ale, IPA and Pilsner. The Session IPA, at 4.1%, uses Citra, Waimea and crystal hops for a citrus finish.

Guest beers
Rivertown Elysium Lager (2023)
Rivertown Ernest Amber Ale (2023)

Out of production
McMulled Beer (2022-23), a 4.4.% recreation of a 1976 recipe infusing Stronghart with apples, sugar and spices.
Camra 1950 Porter (2022-23)
Amber Bay IPA (2022-23)
Rivertown Helles Lager (2022-23)
Rivertown Solstice (2022)
Jubilant 70 Golden Ale (2022)
Normality (2021–22)
Rivertown Freedom (2021–22)
Mac's Oat Brown Stout (2020–21), a 4.4% ABV recreation of a beer produced at the Hertford brewery during the 1930s.
Chinook (2020–21)
OK Bloomer (2021)
Victory Stout (2018)
Carriage Court Ale (2018)
Golden Years (2017)
Special Day (2015)
Hop On A Mo(2015)
Brave Herts (2015)
Flying Frog (2014–16)
Love Herts (2014)
Bard of Ale (2013)
Screaming Reels (2011–13)
Stag Bitter (2008)
Harvest Moon (2006-2008)
Victory 1805 (2005) 
Special Reserve Anniversary Porter (2000)
Oatmeal Ale (1997-2001)
Gladstone (1995-2001)
J.M Premium Bitter (1990s)
Hartsman Lager (1980s)
Crafter Low Alcohol Bitter (1970s)
Mac's Stout (1960s-1970s)
Mitre (1960s-1990s)
Mac's Brown (1960s)
Old Cross (1950s-1960s)
Coronation (1953)
Family Ale (1950s)
Lady Mac (1950s)
Shandimac (1950s-1980s)
No. 3 Special Pale Ale (1950s-1970s)
Nut Brown Ale (1940s-1950s)
Milk Stout (1930s)
Oat Brown Stout (1930s-1950s)
Dinner Ale (1920s)
Dark Beer (1920s-40s), renamed Olde Time Ale during the 1950s and Stronghart in 1993
White Label (1880s-1920s)

Pubs

The Peahen, St Albans
The Woolpack, Hertford
The Millstream, Hertford
Dog and Whistle, Hertford, formerly known as The Ram
Lord Haig, Hertford
Salisbury Arms Hotel, Hertford
Golden Griffin, Hertford
The Greyhound, Bengeo
The Builders Arms, Potters Bar
The Black Bull, Buntingford
The Angel, Waltham Abbey
Baroosh, Hertford, Chelmsford and Bishops Stortford.
The Hare, Harlow
 Nag's Head, Covent Garden.
 The Plough, Crews Hill
 The Kingfisher on the Quay, Mytchett
 The Jolly Postie, formerly Royston Post Office.
Saracens Head, Ware
The King's Mead, Ware
The Sun, Hoddesdon
The Bull, Broxbourne
The Heron on the Lake, Fleet, Hampshire
The White Swan, Westminster, London
The Yew Tree, Walkern
The Old Bank of England, Fleet Street, London
The Harrier (The Hilltop), Hatfield, Hertfordshire
The Hopfields Hatfield, Hertfordshire
The Red Lion Hatfield, Hertfordshire
Hollybush, Loughton, Essex
The Cambridge Tap, Cambridge

References

External links

1992 Independent review by Michael Jackson

Breweries in England
British companies established in 1827
1827 establishments in England
Buildings and structures in Hertford